Roberto Marcelo Álvarez (born 23 February 1971) is an Argentine former professional tennis player.

Álvarez competed on tour in the 1990s and early 2000s, reaching a best singles ranking of 288 in the world. His only ATP Tour main draw appearances came at Bordeaux in 1992, where he lost in the first round to the eighth-seed Fabrice Santoro. He featured twice in the singles qualifying draw at Wimbledon and in 2002 won an ATP Challenger doubles titles in Trani. Following his retirement he coached French tennis player Florent Serra.

Challenger/Futures titles

Singles: (3)

Doubles: (5)

References

External links
 
 

1971 births
Living people
Argentine male tennis players